Mt. Nebo Wildlife Management Area is a Wildlife Management Area in Garrett County, Maryland.

External links
 Mt. Nebo Wildlife Management Area
 U.S. Geological Survey Map at the U.S. Geological Survey Map Website. Retrieved January 10, 2023.

Wildlife management areas of Maryland
Protected areas of Garrett County, Maryland